Sir Powlett Charles John Milbank, 2nd Baronet (1 May 1852 – 30 January 1918), was a British Conservative Member of Parliament.

Milbank was returned to Parliament for Radnorshire in 1895, a seat he held until 1900. He became Lord Lieutenant of the county in the same year. In 1898 he succeeded as second Baronet, of Well and Hart. He died in January 1918, aged 65.

References

Kidd, Charles, Williamson, David (editors). Debrett's Peerage and Baronetage (1990 edition). New York: St Martin's Press, 1990, 

1852 births
1918 deaths
Baronets in the Baronetage of the United Kingdom
Conservative Party (UK) MPs for Welsh constituencies
Lord-Lieutenants of Radnorshire
UK MPs 1895–1900